TSLA may refer to:

 Tesla, Inc. (stock ticker symbol: TSLA), including Tesla Motors
 Tennessee State Library and Archives
 Tennessee Scholastic Lacrosse Association 
 Torso Limb Suit Assembly, part of a Apollo/Skylab space suit

See also

 Texas State Library and Archives Commission
 Tesla (disambiguation)